Super Shore is a reality television series broadcast on MTV Spain and MTV Latin America, which follows the daily lives of nine young people who intend to spend the summer living together in different parts of southern Europe, starting on the Greek island of Mykonos and later in the Spanish city of Madrid. It is an adaptation of the American program Jersey Shore featuring participants from Gandía Shore and Acapulco Shore, the Spanish and Mexican versions of that series, along with Brazilian Igor Freitas of reality Are You the One? Brasil and the Italian Elettra Lamborghini, granddaughter of Ferruccio Lamborghini.

History 
Two years after the end of Gandía Shore and several weeks after announcing the return of Alaska and Mario to MTV, the channel and producer Magnolia TV confirmed the return of the format to Spain with a second season, arising from an alliance between MTV South Europe and MTV Latin America. In this case, the recordings would be transferred to the island of Ibiza, changing the name of the program by Ibiza Shore.

In the new program there would be a group that would combine several participants from Gandía Shore and Acapulco Shore, Spanish and Mexican versions of the Jersey Shore format of US origin.

In this way, a new program would return for the start of the 2015/2016 television season.

Following the opposition by public institutions, such as the federation of SMEs and businessmen in Ibiza MTV announced its resignation to record the program Ibiza Shore in the locality of the Balearic Islands. The chain argued in a statement that "Due to a series Of circumstances that we can not control, the next program of the Shore franchise will not be recorded in Ibiza. "

After the events, finally MTV and the producer Magnolia TV decided that the program would be filmed at various points of the Mediterranean coast and that its would be titled Super Shore.

Seasons

Season 1 (2016)
The recording of Super Shore began at the end of August 2015 and details were known as the house in which the components in Madrid would be hosted and all the information about the participants. It was also known that the date for its premiere would be scheduled for February 2, 2016.

In this edition of the franchise, the shores would work in a recognized gym of Madrid and later like servers rollers of a service of fast food to be able to pay certain expenses of the house.

The show premiered simultaneously on February 2, 2016 on the MTV Latin America, MTV Spain and MTV France networks as originally planned.

In Latin America, through the MTV Latin America streaming platform called MTV Play, all episodes of Super Shore were broadcast two days before their television premiere (from the second episode), for free and at no extra cost.

Season 2 (2016)
June 16, 2016 announced the renewal of the program for a second season, due to the good results obtained with the first season. This was announced through the social networks of the networks MTV Spain and MTV Latin America. Its premiere is planned in Latin America for October 18, 2016 and in Spain on the 23 of the same month, while the recording venue has been Marbella, Spain. In this season, cast member Karime Pindter was replaced by Talía Eisset.

Season 3 (2017)
In March 2017, a third season of the program was confirmed, its premiere is scheduled for October of the same year. On July 3, 2017, it was announced that the new season would be filmed in Rimini, Italy. Elettra Lamborghini was the first to be confirmed as a cast member this season. The next cast members to be confirmed were Karime Pindter, Luis "Potro" Caballero and Igor Freitas. Danik Michell and Victor Ortiz were later added to the cast for this season. MTV Spain held an open casting call, where new cast members Adela, Isaac, and Ferre were chosen online as the replacements for Abraham, Arantxa, and Esteban.

Also, previous cast members Manelyk "Mane" González, Jose Labrador and Talía Loaiza were later confirmed to not take part on this season. On July 5, 2017, Arantxa Bustos confirmed via her personal Instagram page that she was not returning to the show. On July 19, 2017, it was confirmed through social media that former cast members Abraham García, Brenda Zambrano and Tadeo Fernández were guests on this season. On July 29, 2017, it was leaked online that Arantxa was another of the guests to be featured in the upcoming season.

By September 18, 2017, MTV Spain announced the final cast member for the series, being Eva from France, she was cast through a special event set by MTV France in order to choose their representative for this new season of Super Shore.

Cast

Cast members

Special guests

Duration of cast

Notes
 Key:  = Cast member appear in this episode.
 Key:  = Cast member arrives in the house.
 Key:  = Cast member voluntarily leaves the house.
 Key:  = Cast member leaves and returns to the house in the same episode.
 Key:  = Cast member is removed from the house.
 Key:  = Cast member returns to the house.
 Key:  = Cast member features in this episode, but is outside of the house.
 Key:  = Cast member does not feature in this episode.
 Key:  = Cast member leaves the series.
 Key:  = Cast member returns to the series.
 Key:  = Cast member is removed from the series.
 Key:  = Cast member arrives and leaves to the series in the same episode.
 Key:  = Cast member features in this episode despite not being an official cast member at the time.
 Key:  = Cast member appear in this special episode.

Other appearances
As well as appearing on Super Shore, some of the cast members have also competed on other reality television shows.

 Are You the One? El Match Perfecto
Talia Loaiza – Season 2 (2018)
 Campamento de Verano 1
Esteban Martínez – 10th evicted
 Doble tentación
Abraham García – Season 1 (2017) – Runner-up
 Gran Hermano VIP
Elettra Lamborghini – Season 5 (2017) – Fourth
La Casa de los Famosos 
Manelyk Gonzalez – Season 1 (2021) – Runner-up
Luis Caballero – Season 2 (2022) – 3nd evicted
 La casa fuerte
Jaime Ferreira – Season 1 (2020) – Third
 La Isla de las Tentaciones
Isaac Torres – Season 3 (2021) – Finalist
 La ultima tentación
Isaac Torres – Season 1 (2021) – Finalist
 Supervivientes
Abraham García – Season 9 (2014) – Winner
Arantxa Bustos – Season 10 (2015) – 1st evicted
José Labrador – Season 10 (2015) – 2nd evicted
Jaime Ferreira – Season 19 (2020) – 5nd evicted

References

External links 

 Super Shore Official Website in Spanish.

2016 Spanish television series debuts
2017 Spanish television series endings
2010s Spanish television series
Jersey Shore (TV series)
Spanish reality television series
MTV original programming